Ivan Dodig and Mate Pavić were the defending champions, but chose not to participate together this year. Dodig played alongside Jean-Julien Rojer, but lost in the quarterfinals to Ben McLachlan and Jan-Lennard Struff. Pavić teamed up with Oliver Marach, but lost in the final to Julio Peralta and Horacio Zeballos, 1–6, 6–4, [6–10].

Seeds

Draw

Draw

Qualifying

Seeds

Qualifiers
  Martin Kližan /  Jozef Kovalík

Qualifying draw

References
 Main Draw
 Qualifying Draw

German Open - Doubles
2018 International German Open